The 1918 Dayton Triangles season was their sixth season in the Ohio League.  The team finished with a known record of 8–0 and won their first Ohio League title. However, many of the top teams in the league did not field teams this season due to the outbreak of World War I and the Spanish flu pandemic, both of which led to the opening of the season being postponed until the middle of October.

Schedule

References 

Pro Football Archives: Dayton Triangles 1918

Dayton Triangles seasons
Dayton Triangles Season, 1918
Dayton Tri